Rayana Bhagya Lakshmi (born ) is a politician and businesswoman from Vijayawada, Andhra Pradesh, India. She is currently serving as the 12th mayor of Vijayawada. Lakshmi is associated with YSR Congress Party.

Career 
Lakshmi contested in 2021 Vijayawada Municipal Corporation election as a candidate from YSR Congress Party. She was elected as a first-time corporator from the 46th municipal division, which was reserved for BC women category. On 18 March 2021, she took charge as the 12th mayor of Vijayawada. She is also the fifth woman mayor of the city.

References 

Living people
Women mayors of places in Andhra Pradesh
Politicians from Vijayawada
Women in Andhra Pradesh politics
YSR Congress Party politicians
21st-century Indian women politicians
21st-century Indian politicians
1983 births

Mayors of Vijayawada
Telugu politicians